Dasht-e Karim (also Romanized as Dasht-e Karīm; also known as Haft Dasht-e Karīmlū) is a village in Mahur Rural District, Mahvarmilani District, Mamasani County, Fars Province, Iran. At the 2006 census, its population was 39, in 11 families.

References 

Populated places in Mamasani County